Smiley is a 1957 CinemaScope produced comedy film. It tells the story of a young Australian boy who is determined to buy a bicycle for four pounds. Along the way he gets into many misadventures. It was based on the 1945 novel of the same name by Moore Raymond who also co-wrote the film with Anthony Kimmins. Their screenplay received a Best British Screenplay nomination at the BAFTA awards.

Plot
Smiley (Colin Petersen) is a mischievous boy who lives in the small country town of Murrumbilla (based on Augathella). His father is an alcoholic drover who is a poor provider for the family, his mother works as a laundress to make ends meet. Smiley is always getting into trouble with his best friend Joey (Bruce Archer). He decides to try to save up enough money to buy a coveted bicycle.

Smiley takes on various odd jobs, showing enterprise, hard work, and persistence in slowly accumulating the considerable sum (four pound) needed, despite getting involved in a number of pranks, including getting into trouble with the local law enforcement in the figure of Sergeant Flaxman (Chips Rafferty). Smiley unwittingly helps the local publican, Jim Rankin (John McCallum), sell opium to aborigines who live in a camp near the town.

Smiley's father steals his savings and loses it playing two-up. Smiley accidentally knocks him out and runs away to the bush, where he is bitten by a snake. His life is saved by a boundary rider, Bill McVitty (Guy Doleman). Rankin is arrested and the townspeople chip in to buy Smiley a bike.

A romantic subplot involves Rankin and Sergeant Flaxman vying for the affections of Miss Workman the new local schoolmistress (Jocelyn Hernfield).

Cast

 Colin Petersen as Smiley Greevins
 Alexander (Bruce) Thomas as Smiley on Horse
 Bruce Archer as Joey
 Ralph Richardson as Reverend Labeth
 John McCallum as Jim Rankin
 Chips Rafferty as Sergeant Flaxman
 Jocelyn Hernfield as Miss Workman
 Reg Lye as Pa Greevins
 Margaret Christensen as Ma Greevins
 Charles Tingwell as Mr Stevens
 Marion Johns as Mrs Stevens
 Gavin Davies as Fred Stevens
 Toni Hansen as Jean Holt
 William Rees as Mr Johnson
 John Fegan as Nobby
 Guy Doleman as Bill McVitty
 Leonard Teale as doctor
 Letty Craydon as lady at christening

Production
The film is based on the popular 1945 novel Smiley by Moore Raymond, who was born in Queensland but worked as a journalist in Britain. The book was hailed as an Australian Huckleberry Finn and film rights were bought immediately by Sir Alexander Korda. Korda sent Raymond to Australia in 1946 to find a possible child actors and locations over three months. However Korda said he could not find an appropriate director and shelved the project.

Korda eventually assigned the project to Anthony Kimmins, who had served in Australia in World War II. Kimmins arrived in Australia in March 1950 to begin preproduction and announced he would make the film near Augathella for £100,000. However, after actually inspecting the site he doubted it would be useful and he was unable to find a lead actor he was happy with. Plans to make the movie were delayed again.

Kimmins returned to Australia September 1955 to begin preproduction. After interviewing over 2,000 boys, he cast Colin Peterson as Smiley and Bruce Archer as Joey. Part of the budget was provided by 20th Century Fox, who had money frozen in Australia due to currency restrictions. Apart from Ralph Richardson, the entire cast was Australian.

Filming started in late October, with the township of Murrumbilla being created on an estate at Camden Park, Gundy NSW and finished eight weeks later. Post production work was done at Pagewood Studios.

Release
The film was very popular and led to a sequel, Smiley Gets a Gun. It also spawned a hit single, 'A Little Boy Called Smiley', composed by Clyde Collins after the film was completed.

Colin Petersen moved to Britain and enjoyed a successful career as a child actor and musician, including being the drummer of The Bee Gees from 1967 to 1970.

Musical
The novel inspired Smiley The Musical with music by Clyde Collins, David Cocker, Mark Jones and Lance Strauss. The 2004 studio cast recording was performed by John Watson, Jason Barry-Smith, James King, Leisa Barry-Smith, Justine Anderson, Renae Bedford, Samantha Hardgrave, Gabriella Leibowitz, David Irvine, David Cocker, Darryl Weale and Simon Burvill-Holmes.

References

External links
Smiley at the National Film and Sound Archive
 
 Smiley at Oz Movies
 Smiley at TCMDB
 Review of film at Variety
 An abridged version of the novel was published in The Sydney Morning Herald in 1947: 5 Feb, 12 Feb, 19 Feb, 26 Feb, 5 March, 12 March, 19 March, 26 March, 2 April, 9 April, 16 April, 23 April, 30 April, 7 May, 14 May, 21 May, 28 May, 4 June, 11 June, 18 June, 25 June, 2 July, 9 July, 16 July, 23 July - final

American comedy films
British comedy films
1956 films
Films based on Australian novels
London Films films
Films directed by Anthony Kimmins
Films set in Australia
Films scored by William Alwyn
20th Century Fox films
CinemaScope films
1950s English-language films
1950s American films
1950s British films